Roda is a village and one of the 51 Union Councils of Khushab District in the Punjab Province of Pakistan. It is part of Khushab Tehsil and is located at 32°4'26N 72°5'60E lying to the southwest of Khushab City.

History 
The area around Roda was settled during the time of Ranjit Singh in the early decades of the nineteenth century. The village was settled after complete destruction of a village called Moza Joyia. There was fighting around Sahiwal, Jhang and other areas between Ranjit Singh and Rae Ahmed Khan Kharal and Moza Joyia was destroyed. This happened when Ranjit Singh marched in the area in 1821.

The name Roda was assigned to it in Revenue Settlement of 1860. In Punjabi language roda means bald. Since the place was almost absolutely bereft of trees looking like a bald land, it was named as Roda.

As per revenue record of Khushab,  only following castes were inhabiting  Roda Thal in 1860s:
1.JOYIA, 2. Mummak (subcaste of Tiwana), 3.  Kallu, 4. Dhoodhan. 5 Bhatti,6 Bourana, 7. Awan
Notable Personalities of Roda Thal are Malik Saifullah Khan Mummak  Ambassador to Saudi Arabia and Currently posted in Afghanistan, Malik Khuda Bakhsh SHO Raiwind(LAHORE), Master Muhammad Afzal Khan Janjua, MPA Malik Waris Kallu(Late), Chairman Malik Muhammad Ameer Killasi (Late) and MPA Malik Muazzam Sher Kallu Belongs to Roda Thal.

Culture
Roda is home to 39 castes and clans. Both men and women wear the traditional shalwar kameez. Popular sports in Roda include thobi ball (volleyball), cricket, and kabadi. Allah Ditta Nahra (late) and Master Malik Mohammad Sher Chhalra Joyia (late) were the best and famous players of shooting volleyball.

Geography
The town, Roda Thal includes flat as well as desert type land, that is situated in between famous cities, from north Mitha Tiwana, from south Noorpur Thal, from east Chock Girote and from west Adhi Coat .

Economy
Roda Thal economy based on agriculture, business (shops at lower level) [Mobile Shops: (Joyia Mobiles Ramzan Joyia), (Alhaseeb Mobiles Khaliqdad & Naeem Ullah Joyia), (Rehman Mobiles .A.D. Joyia), (Rizvi Mobiles. Ramzan Awan) and farming goats, cows and poultry etc.

Education 
Roda is rich in educational institutes w.r.t its population and culture as it has a Government Degree College (for Boys), two high schools (one for boys and other for girls) and  several primary schools including Government and private institutes. Some famous private institutes are like, (Dar-e- Arqum school, Ghazali Education Trust, Nasar Public High School, Al-Qalam Group of Schools, Faheem Memorial Model School.

References

Union councils of Khushab District
Populated places in Khushab District